Tall Anjir or Tol Anjir may refer to:
 Tall Anjir, Kazerun
 Tall Anjir, Mamasani